Children in Need 2015 is a campaign held in the United Kingdom to raise money for the charity Children in Need. 2015 marks the 30th birthday of the charity's mascot, Pudsey Bear, since 1985, and the 35th anniversary of the appeal which culminated in a live broadcast on BBC One and BBC Two on the evening of Friday 13 November until the early hours of Saturday 14 November. The broadcast was hosted by Dermot O'Leary, a last minute stand in for Sir Terry Wogan, with Tess Daly, Fearne Cotton, Rochelle Humes and Nick Grimshaw as co-hosts. Shane Richie hosted the period the show was broadcasting on BBC Two.	
The show was broadcast from the BBC in Elstree but also includes regular regional opt-outs. Wogan did, however, appear in a pre-filmed Sketch and provided a documentary voice over, but was unable to present the live section of the fundraiser due to ill health, which was to be for the first and only time since its launch in 1980. Wogan died in January 2016, making Children in Need 2014 his last appearance as host.

Telethon
The culmination of Children in Need was the live telethon broadcast on BBC One and BBC Two on 13 November from the BBC Elstree Centre.

Music
Ellie Goulding - "Army"
Children in Need Choir - "The Climb"
Jess Glynne - "Take Me Home"
Rod Stewart - "Way Back Home"
Peter Andre - "Come Fly With Me"
Selena Gomez - "Same Old Love"
Anastacia - "Left Outside Alone"
Shane Filan & Nadine Coyle - "I Could Be"

Sketches
  Neighbours do "H & Claire/Steps"  
  EastEnders does "Top Hat"
Call the Midwife does Strictly Come Dancing
 Warwick Davis finds "Star Wars Superfan", featuring Sir Terry Wogan
 Harry Hill 40 Years of Television with guest: Rebecca Hyland as Laa-Laa from Teletubbies

Totals
The following are totals with the times they were announced on the televised show.

See also
 Children In Need

References

External links
 

2015 in British television
2015
November 2015 events in the United Kingdom